The City of Chester is a constituency represented in the House of Commons of the UK Parliament since 2 December 2022 by Samantha Dixon of the Labour Party. She was elected in the by-election held following the resignation of Chris Matheson MP on 21 October 2022.

Profile 
The constituency covers the English city of Chester on the border of Wales and parts of the surrounding Cheshire West and Chester unitary authority, including the villages of: Aldford, Capenhurst, Christleton, Guilden Sutton, Mollington, Newtown, Pulford and Saughall.

Much of the city of Chester itself is residential of varying characteristics, with more middle-class areas such as Upton and the large rural former council estate of Blacon which is, except where purchased under the right to buy; owned and managed by the local housing association, Chester And District Housing Trust.

History 
As part of a county palatine with a parliament of its own until the early-sixteenth century, Chester was not enfranchised (sent no MPs) until the Chester and Cheshire (Constituencies) Act 1542 (34 & 35 Hen VIII. c. 13), since when it returned two MPs to Parliament as a parliamentary borough. It continued to elect two MPs until the Redistribution of Seats Act 1885 which reduced its representation to one MP.

Under the Representation of the People Act 1918, the parliamentary borough was abolished and replaced by a county division, gaining rural areas from the neighbouring constituencies of Eddisbury and Wirral. Since then, the boundaries of the constituency have remained relatively consistent, primarily reflecting changes in local authority and ward boundaries.

Boundaries 

1918–1950: The County Borough of Chester, the Urban District of Hoole, and the Rural District of Chester.

1950–1974: As prior but with minor boundary changes to align with the revised boundaries of the Rural District of Chester.

1974–1983: The County Borough of Chester, and the Rural District of Chester.

Hoole Urban District had been absorbed by the County Borough of Chester in 1954, but the constituency boundaries remained unchanged.

1983–1997: The City of Chester wards of Blacon Hall, Boughton, Boughton Heath, Christleton, College, Curzon, Dee Point, Dodleston, Grosvenor, Hoole, Newton, Plas Newton, Sealand, Upton Grange, Upton Heath, Vicars Cross, and Westminster.

Rural areas to the north of Chester, comprising the wards of Elton, Mollington and Saughall, transferred to the new constituency of Ellesmere Port and Neston.

1997–2010: The City of Chester wards of Blacon Hall, Boughton, Boughton Heath, Christledon, College, Curzon, Dee Point, Dodleston, Grosvenor, Hoole, Mollington, Newton, Plas Newton, Saughall, Sealand, Upton Grange, Upton Heath, Vicars Cross, and Westminster.

The wards of Mollington and Saughall transferred back from Ellesmere Port and Neston.

2010–2019: The Parliamentary Constituencies (England) Order 2007 defined the boundaries as:

The City of Chester wards of Blacon Hall, Blacon Lodge, Boughton, Boughton Heath, Christleton, City and St Anne's, College, Curzon and Westminster, Dodleston, Handbridge and St Mary's, Hoole All Saints, Hoole Groves, Huntington, Lache Park, Mollington, Newton Brook, Newton St Michael's, Saughall, Upton Grange, Upton Westlea, and Vicars Cross.

Minor changes to reflect revised ward boundaries.

However, before the new boundaries came into force for the 2010 election, the districts making up the county of Cheshire were abolished on 1 April 2009, being replaced by four unitary authorities. Consequently, the constituency's boundaries became:

The Cheshire West and Chester wards of Blacon, Boughton, Chester City, Chester Villages (part), Dodleston and Huntington, Farndon (part), Garden Quarter, Great Boughton, Handbridge Park, Hoole, Lache, Little Neston and Burton, Newton, Saughall and Mollington, and Upton.

2019–present: Following a further local government ward boundary review in 2019, the boundaries are currently:

The Cheshire West and Chester wards of Central and Blacon, Chester City & the Garden Quarter, Christleton & Huntington (part), Farndon (part), Gowy Rural (part), Great Boughton, Handbridge Park, Lache, Newton & Hoole, Saughall and Mollington, and Upton.

Political History

Two-member seat (to 1885) 
From 1715 to 1869, at least one of the two seats was held by a member of the Grosvenor family. For most of the nineteenth century, both MPs represented the Whigs and (later) the Liberals. The Conservatives held one of the two seats from 1859 to 1865 and 1868–1880.

Single-member seat (from 1885) 
The Liberals won the single-member seat in 1885 but, apart from the landslide year of 1906 (won by the Liberals with a majority of just 47 votes), Chester returned Conservative Party MPs continuously from 1886 to 1997. At most elections, majorities were in relative terms medium but the party's MPs won marginal majorities at the 1929 general election over the Liberal candidate (when the Labour Party formed a minority government) and at the 1992 general election over the Labour candidate, when the Conservatives had a small parliamentary majority.

Christine Russell of the Labour Party gained the seat easily from Gyles Brandreth at the 1997 general election after 87 years of Conservative control, and retained it until 2010. Her majority over the Conservatives had been reduced to under 1,000 votes at the 2005 general election.

Stephen Mosley of the Conservatives gained the seat from Labour at the 2010 general election. However, Mosley narrowly lost his seat five years later to Chris Matheson of the Labour Party in 2015 by 93 votes. The 2015 general election result gave the constituency the most marginal majority (0.2%) of Labour's 232 seats won that year.

Matheson was re-elected at the 2017 general election with a significantly increased majority of 9,176 votes, one of the largest swings to Labour in the election. At 56.8%, it was the highest share of the vote that Labour has ever had in the constituency and it is no longer considered a marginal seat. At the 2019 election, Matheson was elected once again, with a reduced but still comfortable majority of 11.3%. On 21 October 2022 he resigned after allegations of sexual impropriety led him to be suspended from the House of Commons for four weeks, occasioning a by-election held on 1 December, which was won by Samantha Dixon with an increased majority for Labour.

Members of Parliament

MPs 1545 to 1660 

† Smith and Gamull were both disabled from serving in 1644.

MPs 1660–1880

MPs since 1885

Elections

Elections in the 2020s

Elections in the 2010s
https://www.bbc.co.uk/news/politics/constituencies/E14000640

Elections in the 2000s

Elections in the 1990s

Elections in the 1980s

Elections in the 1970s

Elections in the 1960s

Elections in the 1950s

Elections in the 1940s

Elections in the 1930s

Elections in the 1920s

Elections in the 1910s

Elections in the 1900s

Elections 1832-1900

 Caused by Dodson's appointment as President of the Local Government Board

 

 

Succession of Earl Grosvenor to the peerage as Marquess of Westminster.

 

 

 

 

 Caused by Jervis' resignation after his appointment as Chief Justice of the Court of Common Pleas.

 Caused by Grosvenor's resignation, by accepting the office of Steward of the Chiltern Hundreds, in order to contest a by-election at Middlesex

 Caused by Grosvenor's appointment as Treasurer of the Household

 Caused by Jervis' appointment as Solicitor-General for England and Wales

Elections before 1832

 Caused by Cunliffe-Offley's death

 Caused by Grosvenor vacating his seat

 Caused by Grosvenor's appointment as Comptroller of the Household

See also 

 List of parliamentary constituencies in Cheshire
History of parliamentary constituencies and boundaries in Cheshire

Notes

References

External links 
nomis Constituency Profile for City of Chester — presenting data from the ONS annual population survey and other official statistics.

Constituencies of the Parliament of the United Kingdom established in 1545
Parliamentary constituencies in Cheshire
Politics of Chester